The Goeldi's marmoset or Goeldi's monkey (Callimico goeldii) is a small, South American New World monkey that lives in the upper Amazon basin region of Bolivia, Brazil, Colombia, and Peru. It is the only species classified in the genus Callimico, and the monkeys are sometimes referred to as "callimicos". The species takes its name from its discoverer, Swiss-Brazilian naturalist Emil August Goeldi.

Goeldi's marmosets are blackish or blackish-brown in color and the hair on their head and tail sometimes has red, white, or silverly brown highlights. They weigh about 0.4835 Kg in captivity and 0.500 Kg in the wild. Their digits have claw like nails except for the hallux, which serve for clinging, scansorial travel, and to extract food from trees.

Taxonomy and evolution 
Goeldi's marmoset was first described in 1904, making Callimico one of the more recent monkey genera to be described. In older classification schemes it was sometimes placed in its own family Callimiconidae and sometimes, along with the marmosets and tamarins, in the subfamily Callitrichinae in the family Cebidae. More recently, Callitrichinae has been (re-)elevated to family status as Callitrichidae.

Molecular phylogenetics shows that C. goeldii evolved from an ancestral callitrichine and shares this origin with marmosets making them sister taxa. One evolutionary argument to account for their differences, states that C. goeldii conserves primitive traits such as single births and a third molar lost in many marmosets. Alternatively, another evolutionary argument indicates that Callimicos came from a two-molar marmoset and reintroduced the remote traits, which in either case selectively give them the ability to access to different resources and occupy different niches. Similarities in delayed embryonic development and secondary limb-bone ossification between C. goeldii and marmosets are evidence of their close evolutionary relationship.

Reproduction 
Females reach sexual maturity at 8.5 months, males at 16.5 months. The gestation period lasts from 144 to 159 days. Callimicos studied in captivity in North America and Europe for near 40 years have shown to produce on average 3.5 offspring during their lifetime. However, 30% of the females and 45% of the males observed in these settings never reproduced.

Unlike other New World monkeys, they have the capacity to give birth twice a year. Biannual births occur regularly in captivity and less consistently in the wild and are attributed to postpartum estrus that allows the female to be ready to reproduce soon after parturition. The availability of fungus -an important food source for C. goeldii- throughout the year also contributes to these multiple births.

The mother carries a single baby monkey per pregnancy, whereas most other species in the family Callitrichidae usually give birth to twins. These singleton births provide the offspring with longer maternal care and weaning delay that results in faster growth rates and in turn earlier sexual maturity than the other marmosets.

Infant care 
For the first 2–3 weeks the mother acts as the primary caregiver after which the father and the helpers, who are often the siblings, share many of the responsibilities. However, mothers in the wild have been observed giving their babies to other members of the troop as early as 10 days after parturition, which is late for other marmosets.

At birth, Callimicos offspring weigh 10% the weight of their mother’s whereas the twinning marmosets weight double that amount, which explains the delay in allocare in C. goeldii since it is not as crucial as it is for its counterparts. Cooperative care in callitrichines is therefore necessary to help mothers recover from gestation, parturition, and lactation as well as to share the energetic cost of carrying the infant among the helpers and the father.

Caregivers must also provide food to the infants when they turn 4 weeks of age. The task of food provisioning includes tolerance to food robbing since infants are at a stage of learning how to forage by themselves. Also at week 4, mothers stop nursing in the wild, but that behaviour is believed to be influenced by the presence of the observers and therefore, it is suspected that nursing resumes when humans are not present. Whereas C. goeldii in captivity, nursing extends until the infant is 8-15 weeks old. Thus, the offspring will be weaned when it becomes about 63 days of age.  There is no difference between male and female helpers on the amount of involvement on infant care. Even juvenile C. goeldii participate as active caregivers.

Infants are carried entirely during the first month and 63% of the time on the next month. They do not leave their guardian side until they become 2.5 months of age and around 3 months old, they are rarely carried, but locomotive independence comes more forcibly than voluntarily. Females outnumber males by 2 to 1. The life expectancy in captivity is about 10 years.

Development 
From birth to about 18 months old, callimicos grow faster than other marmosets in part because the energy they would otherwise invest on thermal regulation and activity costs if they were not carried by their mothers is instead directed to growth. Likewise, a longer lactation period is also responsible for a faster development. Growth rate and weight gain is similar in both male and female infants and juveniles.

Distribution and habitat 
Callimicos’ geographic distribution extends from the Colombian Amazon in the Rio Caquetá to the Peruvian Amazon down to the western Brazilian Amazon and into the Pando department of northwestern Bolivia. Its presence on the Ecuadorian Amazon has yet to be confirmed. The distribution of this species is patchy, and its density seems to be dependent on its polyspecific associations with tamarins.

Sightings of callimicos have been made at the base of the Cordillera Oriental of the Andes in Colombia in the Department of Putumayo along the Putumayo and Caquetá rivers.

In Peru, to the north of the country, they occur in the Pucacuro National Reserve close to the Tigre River, where they are known as Chichi by residents in the area. To the south, they are found at the Centro de Investigación y Capacitación Río Los Amigos (CICRA), the Manu National Park, and the Concesión de Conservación Rodal Semillero Tahuamanu (CCRST), as well as at areas adjacent to the two later ones. Callimicos were also spotted near the Yurua River and Sierra del Divisor in groups of 3 to 12 individuals each.

Some of the records were obtained by trapping during the 70s and 80, and on one of those occasions, the group was brought for breeding at the Centro de Conservación y Reprodución de Primates in Iquitos. Provisioning in stationary sites and playbacks that mimicked their vocalizations and that of tamarines with whom they associate were also employed to attract them.

In Brazil, they occur in the south-west Amazon of the state of Acre in Brazil, over the Serra do Divisor south near Juruá river, into the Gregório river at the state of Amazonas, to the Laco river, further south to the upper Purús and in the Madeira basin near the Abunã river in the state of Rondônia. High densities of this species have been recorded in the Pando department in Bolivia. 

Goeldi's marmosets prefer to forage in dense scrubby undergrowth; perhaps because of this, they are rare, with groups living in separate patches of suitable habitat, separated by miles of unsuitable flora. In the wet season, their diet includes fruit, insects, spiders, lizards, frogs, and snakes. In the dry season, they feed on fungi, the only tropical primates known to depend on this source of food. They live in small social groups (approximately six individuals) that stay within a few feet of one another most of the time, staying in contact via high-pitched calls. They are also known to form polyspecific groups with tamarins such as the white-lipped tamarin and brown-mantled tamarin.  This is perhaps because Goeldi's marmosets are not known to have the X-linked polymorphism which enables some individuals of other New World monkey species to see in full tri-chromatic vision.

Gallery

References

External links

ARKive - images and movies of the Goeldi's monkey (Callimico goeldii)
Press release on recent research on Goeldi's monkey by scientists at the University of Washington
Primate Info Net Callimico goeldii Factsheet
Pictures of Goeldi's Monkey

Goeldi's marmoset
Mammals of Bolivia
Mammals of Brazil
Mammals of Colombia
Mammals of Ecuador
Mammals of Peru
Goeldi's marmoset
Taxa named by Oldfield Thomas
Articles containing video clips